The Immaculate Conception Cathedral, also known as Tepic Cathedral, is the cathedral of the Roman Catholic Diocese of Tepic in Mexico. It is located on the main square, in the center of the city. It is famous for its Neo-Gothic style architecture.

The first building, smaller in size than the current structure, was built around 1750.

At the beginning of the nineteenth century, it was decided to construct a larger cathedral. Construction was completed in the year 1885. The church was designated as a cathedral by Pope Leo XIII, on June 23, 1891, with its first bishop Ignacio Díaz y Macedo.

The current facade was designed by Gabriel Luna y Rodriguez, who continued the previous facade work in a Neo-Gothic style, different from the neoclassical taste that prevailed at the time. The last tower was completed in 1896.

The interior was modified in the 19th century, replacing the main altar with a large cross.

See also
Roman Catholicism in Mexico
Immaculate Conception Cathedral

References

Roman Catholic cathedrals in Mexico
Roman Catholic churches completed in 1885
19th-century Roman Catholic church buildings in Mexico